Bolungarvíkurgöng (regionally also ) is a tunnel in northwestern Iceland, located in Westfjords along Route 61.

One of the main objectives of building the tunnel was to replace one of Iceland's most dangerous roads, which connected two of the largest towns in the area, Ísafjörður and Bolungarvík, and thereby improve road safety. The old road lies along the seashore under the steep and unstable mountain hills of Óshlíd, and was subject to frequent avalanches and rockfalls. Other objectives include improved road connections and reduced travel times, such that the distance between Ísafjordur and Bolungarvík would be similar to that between districts in a city.

Bolungarvik Tunnel details:

 Tunnel length: 5.426 km 
 Cross section of the tunnel: 54 m²
 Maximum width of the tunnel: 8.7 m
 Two-lane highway
 Number of emergency lay-bys: 10

As part of the construction project, an additional  of road was built, including a pair of bridges crossing the Ósá and Langá rivers.

References

Road tunnels in Iceland
Tunnels completed in 2010
Buildings and structures in Westfjords